On with the New is a 1938 Fleischer Studios animated short film starring Margie Hines as the voice of Betty Boop.

Synopsis
Betty is an overworked cook and dishwasher at a local eatery. She quits her job to run an automated childcare center. However, she finds the job even harder than her previous job when the babies in her care start acting rowdy, so she returns to her old job.

References

External links
On with the New on Youtube.
 
 On with the New at The Big Cartoon Database.

1938 short films
Betty Boop cartoons
1930s American animated films
American black-and-white films
1938 animated films
Paramount Pictures short films
Fleischer Studios short films
Short films directed by Dave Fleischer
1930s English-language films
American comedy short films
American animated short films
Films about babies